Yelagiri is a hill station located in the newly formed Tirupattur district of Tamil Nadu, India, situated off the Vaniyambadi-Tirupattur road. Located at an altitude of 1,110.6 metres above Mean Sea Level and spread across 30 km2, the Yelagiri Hill (also spelled Elagiri Hill at times) is surrounded by orchards, rose-gardens, and green valleys. Yelagiri is a branch of Annamalai Hills.

History

Yelagiri or Elagiri is a small hill station located in between the towns of Vaniyambadi and Jolarpettai (Tamil Nadu, India). The hill station dates back to the British colonial days.

"The Whole of Yelagiri was once the private property of the Yelagiri Zamindar Family. It was taken over by the government of India during the Early 1950s. The house of the Yelagiri Zamindars still exists in Reddiyur."

British administered Elagiri (Neelagiri) or Swami Malai or Kolli Malai. During 1960's Yelagiri was refuge to people groups who were involved in Emergency Rule of India. Their near-dynasty was terminated after withdrawal of Emergency Rule. It was left uninhabited until French Missionary Fr. Francis Guezou (Salesian) first arrived who helped Jawadhu Hills people to inhabit the hills. Yelagiri is now over populated by India's corporatism, political ventures and local tourism, since 2007 onwards.

Location And Overview
The Yelagiri hill station is not as developed as other hill stations in Tamil Nadu like Ooty or Kodaikanal. However, the district administration has now taken up the task of developing Yelagiri Hills into a tourist destination by promoting adventure sports such as paragliding and rock climbing.

Yelagiri is one of the famous places for trekkers in India. The hill station is located at a height of 1410.6 meters above sea level.  Yelagiri comprises 14 hamlets and a number of temples spread over several hills.

The highest point in Yelagiri is the Swamimalai Hill, standing tall at 4,338 ft; Swamimalai is a destination and viewpoint for trekkers. The hill provides a number of trekking trails through thick reserved forests. Mangalam, a small village, is at the base of this hill. There are other trekking options that include smaller peaks like Javadi Hills and Palamathi Hills.

Yelagiri Hills is home to hundreds of snakes.

Climate
Yelagiri's climate is cool in the monsoon season. The daily weather is generally pleasant. In winter, there is much less rainfall than in summer. This climate is considered to be Aw according to the Köppen-Geiger climate classification.

People
Prehistoric Yelagiri is found to have modern settlement since 10,000 BC (post-ice age). After Roman presence until after European dark ages, human activities in Yelagiri Hills was evident before Moghul era. Spanish Pilgrim Fathers had initiated religious settlement in Yelagiri Hills 400 years ago. Tamil Tribal clan, namely Thodas inhabited the Hills and its surrounding before the Vellala Gounder or 'Malai Yali' (not to be confused with Malayalees). Malayali denotes people who live in mountains. Malayali people also called as "Karalar" which means 'one who rules the clouds'. Malayali people claim to come from plains, they are from the Kancheepuram district.   Another native tribal groups are the Irular.

Religion
Buddhism like other parts of Tamil Nadu thrived in Yelagiri Hills too followed by failed Catholic Monasticism (Augustinian). Buddhism, perhaps ended with factors of entity-relationship, highly prevalent among Buddhist traditions. However, no religion was welcomed in the Hills or proponents of religion were facing unfathomable conditions of life. In 1970's Christianity thrived but was abruptly ended due to Emergency Rule. Most of the Tamil people are Hindus. They commonly worship Shiva in the name of 'Nachiappan' and Parvati in the name of 'Nachiamma'. A temple for Murugan (son of Shiva and Parvati) was built in the 1960s. Recently more Churches were also established by the Christian missionary. Mosques are also available in the area.

Education
Earlier only a few Christian missionary schools were available for primary school education, but now more Residential schools have come up in this region.

Educational Institutions: There are schools in the various hamlets around Elagiri including the Government School and St. Charles School which are primarily for day scholars. There are also three residential schools –Peace Garden Matriculation School,Ebenezer Matriculation and Higher Secondary School (Residential), and Samaritan Residential Schools. The Don Bosco has recently started an Arts and Science College for the benefit of local community.

The Yelagiri Summer Festival
The famous Yelagiri Summer festival celebrated in May end is organised by the Tamil Nadu Tourism Development Board. Stalls from different departments, Flowers show, Boat house various cultural programs and Dog Show with a variety of dog breeds are conducted every year. People from all over the State and other parts of the country participate in this annual festival.

Places of interest

Nature Park: A Park was established in the year 2008. It consists of an aquarium, rose garden, an artificial water fall, and a musical fountain. Numerous Private birds parks has been functional over all the season. Mountain view Adventure park is a terrific spot for adventure lovers. Must visit place for kids.

Punganoor Lake Park : It is one of the most popular landmark in Yelagiri Hills. It is an artificial lake 25 feet deep with an adjoining park.

Jalagamparai Waterfalls: A short distance away, on the other side of the hill, is Jalagamparai falls,Situated at a distance of 14 km from Tirupattur. The murmuring Attaru river flows through the Yelagiri Hills, and plummets down to form a highly captivating waterfall. It's an hour, 5 km, walk from Yelagiri downhill. Though there is a direct route from Yelagiri to the falls, it is often closed. One has to go all the way down the hill, take the plains, and then climb the hill on the other side. It's an hour's journey.

Swami Malai Hills: Swami malai hills are the hills in the shape of cake with a strong base at the bottom and a high peak. Trekking is an attraction at Swami Malai hills. This trek leads one to a small peak from where the entire valley is visible.

Telescope observatory: A telescope observatory near Yelagiri hill was also of attraction to visitors. It has now been shut down.

Gallery

References

Further reading

Hill stations in Tamil Nadu
Paragliding in India
Tourist attractions in Vellore
Ashrams
Spiritual organizations